Giles Milton FRHistS (born 15 January 1966) is a British writer who specialises in narrative history. His books have sold more than one million copies in the UK. and been published in twenty-five languages. He has written twelve works of non-fiction, a thriller, two comic novels and three books for young children. He is best known for his 2016 Sunday Times best-selling title, Churchill's Ministry of Ungentlemanly Warfare, and for his 1999 best-seller, Nathaniel's Nutmeg.
Milton is the writer and narrator of the podcast series, Ministry of Secrets, produced by Somethin' Else and Sony.

Biography 
Born in Buckinghamshire, Milton was educated at Latymer Upper School  and the University of Bristol. He lives in London and Burgundy and is married to the artist and illustrator, Alexandra Milton. He has three daughters.

He has been a Trustee of the London Library<ref>Patrons, Presidents and Trustees https://www.londonlibrary.co.uk/about-us/patron-president-trustees</ref> since 2015.

Works
 Non-fiction 
 The Riddle and the Knight: In Search of Sir John Mandeville, 1996 
 Nathaniel's Nutmeg: How One Man's Courage Changed the Course of History, 1999 
 Big Chief Elizabeth: The Adventures and Fate of the First English Colonists in America, 2000 
 Samurai William: The Englishman Who Opened Japan, 2002 
 White Gold: The Extraordinary Story of Thomas Pellow and North Africa's One Million European Slaves, 2005, Sceptre, 
 Paradise Lost: Smyrna 1922, 2008, Sceptre, 
 Wolfram: The Boy Who Went To War, 2011, Sceptre, 
 Russian Roulette: A Deadly Game: How British Spies Thwarted Lenin's Global Plot, 2013, Sceptre, 
 Fascinating Footnotes from History, 2015, John Murray. When Hitler Took Cocaine and Lenin Lost His Brain, 2016, Picador, When Churchill Slaughtered Sheep and Stalin Robbed a Bank, 2016, Picador, Churchill's Ministry of Ungentlemanly Warfare, 2016, John Murray. D-Day: The Soldiers' Story, 2019, John Murray. Soldier, Sailor, Frogman, Spy, Airman, Gangster, Kill or Die: How the Allies Won on D-Day, 2019, Henry Holt & Company,  (paperback published as Soldier, Sailor, Frogman, Spy, 2021,  Checkmate Berlin: The Cold War Showdown That Shaped the Modern World, 2021, Henry Holt & Company, 

 Novels 
 Edward Trencom's Nose: A Novel of History, Dark Intrigue, and Cheese, 2007
 According to Arnold: A Novel of Love and Mushrooms, 2009
 The Perfect Corpse, 2014, ISBN 978-0992897222

 Children's books 
 Call Me Gorgeous, 2009, Alexandra Milton, illustrator.
 Zebedee's Zoo, 2009, Kathleen McEwen, illustrator.
 Good Luck Baby Owls, 2012, Alexandra Milton, illustrator.
 Children of the Wild, 2013.

 Checkmate in Berlin Checkmate in Berlin is Milton's twelfth work of narrative history. It tells the story of post-war Berlin from 1945 to 1949, when the city was divided between the four victorious powers – the United States, Britain, France and the Soviet Union. Milton's narrative reveals how the veneer of civility between the Western allies and the Soviets was to break down in spectacular fashion as rival systems, ideologies and personalities turned the German capital into a dangerous battleground.

Milton's book focuses on the leading characters, including commandant of Berlin's American sector Col Frank L. Howley, his Soviet opposite number, General Alexander Kotikov and the British Deputy Director Brigadier Robert Hinde. It draws on unpublished diaries, memoirs and interviews from The National Archives, Imperial War Museum, United States Army War College and the National Archives and Records Administration.

 D-Day: The Soldiers' Story D-Day: The Soldiers' Story is Milton's eleventh work of narrative history. It narrates the events of D-Day - 6 June 1944 - through the tales of survivors from all sides: teenage Allied conscripts, German defenders and French resistance fighters.

The narrative reveals the terror of those trapped in the frontline of Operation Overlord. It also gives voice to some who have hitherto remained unheard – the French butcher's daughter, the Panzer Commander's wife, the chauffeur to the General Staff.

The research was drawn from original source material: oral interviews, handwritten diaries and typescript accounts. Milton's gave voice to the raw, unvarnished experiences of those who were there. The book was published on 20 September 2018 in the UK and in 2019 in the USA.

 Churchill's Ministry of Ungentlemanly Warfare Churchill's Ministry of Ungentlemanly Warfare is Milton's tenth work of narrative history. It became an immediate bestseller, entering the Sunday Times bestseller list in the week of publication.

It tells the story of a secret irregular warfare organisation that was founded in London in the spring of 1939. Its purpose was to plot the destruction of Hitler's war machine through acts of sabotage. Starting as two separate but linked organisations, Section D and MI(R), it was later expanded into two new organisations, the Special Operations Executive and MD1. These worked together, with SOE plotting missions and training saboteurs and MD1 producing bespoke weaponry.

Six key individuals worked at the heart of these two guerrilla units: Colin Gubbins, Millis Jefferis, Cecil Vandepeer Clarke, Eric A. Sykes, William Fairbairn and George Rheam. These gentleman mavericks, who were all creative in their approach to warfare, planned most of the most spectacular acts of sabotage of the Second World War. Their missions included Operation Josephine B, Operation Postmaster, Operation Chariot, Operation Anthropoid, Operation Gunnerside, the destruction of the Peugeot factory at Sochaux and many smaller missions conducted in the weeks prior to the Normandy landings.

Their work was hailed by General Dwight D. Eisenhower as playing "a very considerable part in our complete and final victory".

 Fascinating Footnotes From History Fascinating Footnotes From History is Milton's ninth narrative history book. Published in 2015 in the UK, it is a collection of little-known stories from world history previously published as 4 e-books (When Hitler Took Cocaine, When Stalin Robbed a Bank, When Lenin Lost His Brain, and When Churchill Slaughtered Sheep). The true stories come from Milton's own research and include topics like Adolf Hitler's cocaine use, criminal experience of Joseph Stalin, assassination of Grigori Rasputin and different information about Winston Churchill, Charlie Chaplin, Agatha Christie and other 20th century famous people. The book is only available in the United States as 2 separate volumes: When Hitler Took Cocaine and Lenin Lost His Brain: History's Unknown Chapters and When Churchill Slaughtered Sheep and Stalin Robbed A Bank.

 Russian Roulette Russian Roulette is Milton's eighth work of narrative history.

It is an historical account of a small group of British spies smuggled into Soviet Russia in the aftermath of the 1917 Bolshevik revolution. The spies were sent to Russia by Mansfield Cumming, the first director of the Secret Intelligence Service. The aim was to thwart Lenin's Bolshevik-Islamic plot to topple British India and, ultimately, the Western democracies.

The spies included Sidney Reilly, Arthur Ransome, George Hill, Somerset Maugham, Paul Dukes and Augustus Agar. They worked undercover and in disguise, operating out of Moscow and Petrograd.

A second group of British agents was simultaneously sent into Central Asia (notably Tashkent). Frederick Bailey and Wilfrid Malleson were employed by Indian Political Intelligence, a body working closely with the Secret Intelligence Service.

In the period between 1918 and 1921 the spies in Moscow infiltrated Soviet commissariats, the Red Army and Cheka (secret police). They were variously involved in murder, deception and duplicity and, together with the British diplomat Robert Bruce Lockhart, were also implicated in a botched attempt to assassinate Lenin.

The spies in Tashkent and Kashgar saw themselves as playing the final chapter of the Great Game, the struggle for political mastery of Central Asia. 
Milton argues that the greatest achievement of these two groups of spies was to infiltrate the Comintern and unpick Lenin's plan for global revolution. 
The spies in Russian Roulette laid the foundation stones for today's professional secret services and were the inspiration for many fictional heroes, from James Bond to Jason Bourne.

Milton's book also gives a detailed account of Winston Churchill's chemical weapon campaign against Bolshevik forces in northern Russia in 1919.Russian Roulette is drawn from previously unknown secret documents held in the Indian Political Intelligence archives and in the National Archives.

 Wolfram: The Boy Who Went to War Wolfram: The Boy Who Went to War is Milton's seventh work of narrative non-fiction. It recounts the early life of Wolfram Aichele, a young artist whose formative years were spent in the shadow of the Third Reich.

Wolfram Aichele's parents were deeply hostile to the Nazis. Many of their interests, including freemasonry and the philosophy of Rudolf Steiner, conflicted with the politics of Nazism. Wolfram's father, the artist Erwin Aichele, managed to avoid joining the Nazi Party. But he could do nothing to prevent his son being drafted into the Reichsarbeitsdienst or Reich Labour Service in 1942, the first step into the Wehrmacht.

Aichele was sent to the Ukraine and Crimea, where he contracted a life-threatening strain of diphtheria. In 1944 he was sent to Normandy in France, where he served in the 77th Infantry Division as a 'funker' or Morse code operator. He took part in the German army's doomed attempt to halt American troops from breaking out of their beachhead on Utah Beach.

Wolfram Aichele survived a massive aerial bombardment in June 1944. Two months later, he surrendered to American forces and was a prisoner of war, first in England and then in America, where he was interned at Camp Gruber in Oklahoma. When he returned to Germany in 1946, he discovered that his home town, Pforzheim, had been more than 80% destroyed in the Royal Air Force's firestorm raid of 23 February 1945.

Milton's book received widespread critical acclaim for its use of original unpublished source material and its account of the lives of ordinary Germans. In America, the book is published under the title The Boy Who Went to War: The Story of a Reluctant German Soldier in World War II.

 Paradise Lost: Smyrna 1922 Paradise Lost: Smyrna 1922 is Milton's sixth work of narrative history. It is a graphic account of the bloody sacking of Smyrna (modern Izmir) in September 1922, and subsequent expulsion of 1,300,000 Orthodox Greeks from Turkey and 350,000 Muslims from Greece is recounted through the eyes of the Levantine community. The book won plaudits for its impartial approach to a contentious episode of history.

The story of the destruction of the second city in Ottoman Turkey and subsequent exodus of two million Greeks from Anatolia and elsewhere is told through the eyewitness accounts of those who were there, making use of unpublished diaries and letters written by Smyrna's Levantine elite: he contends that their voices are among the few impartial ones in a highly contentious episode of history.

The book has won plaudits for its historical balance: it has been published in both Turkish and Greek. The Greek edition has received widespread coverage in the Greek press.It received publicity in the United States when the New York Times revealed that Presidential candidate John McCain was reading it while on the campaign trail in 2008. It featured on a 2008 list of books considered by David Cameron's Conservative Party to be essential reading by any prospective Member of Parliament.

According to Milton, Smyrna occupied a unique position in the Ottoman Empire. Cosmopolitan, rich and tolerant in matters of religion, it was the only city in Turkey with a majority Christian population. Her unusual demographic had earned her the epithet 'giaour' or 'infidel'. Tensions between Smyrna's Christians and Muslims had first been inflamed by the First Balkan War of 1912–1913. These tensions were to increase dramatically during the First World War. The majority of Smyrna's population – including the city's politically astute governor, Rahmi Bey – favoured the Allied cause. They hoped that Turkey, along with her Central Powers partners, would lose the war. The city's political position was to be a subject of intense debate at the Paris Peace Conference, 1919. Greece's Prime Minister, Eleftherios Venizelos, had long dreamed of incorporating the city into a newly revived Greek Empire in Asia Minor – the so-called Megali Idea or Great Idea, and argued his case with considerable aplomb: American President Woodrow Wilson and Britain's Prime Minister David Lloyd George eventually consented to Greek troops being landed in Smyrna.Paradise Lost chronicles the violence that followed the Greek landing through the eyewitness accounts of the Levantine community. The author offers a reappraisal of Smyrna's first Greek governor, Aristidis Stergiadis, whose impartiality towards both Greeks and Turks won him considerable enmity amongst the local Greek population.

The Greek army was despatched into the interior of Anatolia in an attempt to crush the fledgling army of the Turkish Nationalists, led by Mustafa Kemal. The book provides a graphic account of this doomed military campaign: by the summer of 1922, the Greek army was desperately short of supplies, weaponry and money. Kemal seized the moment and attacked.

The third section of Paradise Lost is a day-by-day account of what happened when the Turkish army entered Smyrna. The narrative is constructed from accounts written principally by Levantines and Americans who witnessed the violence first hand, in which the author seeks to apportion blame and discover who started the conflagration that was to cause the city's near-total destruction. The book' also investigates the cynical role played by the commanders of the 21 Allied battleships in the bay of Smyrna, who were under orders to rescue only their own nationals, abandoning to their fate the hundreds of thousands of Greeks and Armenian refugees gathered on the quayside.

Many were saved only when a lone American charity worker named Asa Jennings commandeered a fleet of Greek ships and ordered them to sail into the bay of Smyrna. Jennings mission was, contends Milton, one of the greatest humanitarian rescue missions of the 20th century.Paradise Lost: Smyrna 1922 ends with the exodus of two million Greeks from Turkey and the expulsion of 400,000 Turks from Greece – an exchange of population that was enshrined in law in the 1923 Treaty of Lausanne.

 White Gold White Gold investigates the slave trade in North Africa – the enslavement of white people that saw almost one million Europeans enslaved between 1600 and 1800. Milton focuses on the Moroccan slave markets of Salé and Meknes, where slaves were fattened up before being sold at auction. The author reconstructs the voyage of an English ship, the Francis, which was captured by Barbary corsairs in 1716. He investigates the fate of the captured crew, focusing on the cabin boy, Thomas Pellow, who was to be enslaved at the court of the Moroccan sultan for the next twenty three years.

The sultan, Mulay Ismail, a cruel and capricious master: was in the midst of constructing a vast imperial palace to adorn his capital, Meknes. The palace was being built as a conscious attempt by Mulay Ismail to outshine his French contemporary, King Louis XIV, whose Palace of Versailles had been completed a few years earlier. The sultan's slaves – among them Pellow and his 51 shipmates – were compelled to work on the palace's construction. It was gruelling physical labour made worse by the brutal slave drivers who beat any slave who slacked in his work.

Milton's narrative draws on original documents, unpublished diaries and manuscript letters housed in The National Archives and the British Library manuscript collection. White Gold also makes use of the published narrative written by Pellow himself.

One English slave, Abraham Browne, left a detailed account of his life in the days prior to being sold. He was fed "fresh vitteles [victuals] once a daye and sometimes twice in abondance, with good white breade from the market place." Browne correctly surmised that the bread was "to feed us up for the markett [so] that we might be in some good plight agaynst the day wee weare to be sold." Once bought, most slaves never again saw freedom. The vast majority were to die in captivity.

Thomas Pellow had a different fate: he would eventually escape and make his return to England. He found passage aboard a ship bound for Penryn, Cornwall. When he arrived home in 1738, 23 years after leaving home, Pellow's parents did not recognise their son.

Milton quotes Professor Robert. C. Davis when trying to estimate the number of white slaves between 1530 and 1780. He wrote "there were certainly a million, and quite possibly as many as a million and quarter white, European Christians enslaved by the Muslims of the Barbary coast".

 Samurai William Samurai William is an historical portrayal of the life and adventures of William Adams – an Elizabethan adventurer who was shipwrecked in Japan in 1600. William Adams's story inspired the 1975 best-selling novel Shōgun by James Clavell, recounting the history of early European contacts with the Japanese shōgun and the ultimately doomed attempts of the English East India Company to forge profitable trading links with Japan.

William Adams set sail from Rotterdam in 1598, having been employed as pilot on the Dutch ship Liefde (Love). The Liefde was one of five vessels whose ostensible purpose was to head for the Spice Islands or Maluku Islands of the East Indies. But the expedition's financiers also encouraged their captains to attack and ransack Spanish possessions on the coast of South America. The fleet was scattered as it emerged through the Strait of Magellan and into the Pacific Ocean. The captain and crew of the Liefde – concerned that their cargo of broadcloth would not have a ready market in the tropical Spice Islands – took the extraordinary decision to head to Japan, a land of which they were wholly ignorant.

The voyage was fraught with hardship and suffering: atrocious weather and diminishing supplies soon have a deleterious effect on the men's health. On 12 April 1600, William Adams sighted the coast of Japan: by this time, only 24 crew members were still alive.

The book makes use of original source documents – including manuscript letters and journals – to portray of Adams's two decades in Japan. The book reveals Adams's personal skill in dealing the Japanese and suggests that he was adept at adapting to Japanese culture. He helped his cause by deliberately creating a divide between himself and the Portuguese Jesuit missionaries who were becoming increasingly unpopular in Japanese courtly circles.

He soon came to the attention of the ruling shogun, Tokugawa Ieyasu, for whom he built two European style sailing vessels. Ieyasu rewarded Adams with gifts – including a country estate near the imperial capital of Edo. Adams was also honoured with the title of hatamoto or bannerman, a prestigious position that made him a direct retainer of the shogun's court. It also linked Adams to the warrior class that had dominated Japanese history for centuries: all of Adams's fellow hatamoto were samurai. Adams was by now living like the native Japanese. He spoke the language fluently, wore a courtly kimono and changed his name to Miura Anjin (Mr Pilot). He also married a Japanese woman of good birth, even though he had left behind a wife and daughter in England.

Much of Samurai William deals with the ultimately doomed attempts of the East India Company to make use of Adams's influence at court in order to open a trading station at Hirado in south-west Japan. The account of life in Hirado is told through original sources – notably the personal diary of Richard Cocks, head of the factory in Hirado, and the journal of Captain John Saris, commander of the ship that brought the East India Company merchants to Japan.
The author quotes widely from original documents now housed in the British Library: these were edited and published by Anthony Farrington in his The English Factory in Japan.Samurai William provides an account of Adams's death in May 1620, and the sorry decline of the doomed trading post. It ends with the brutal suppression of Christianity in Japan and the closure of the country to foreign trade for more than two centuries.

 Big Chief Elizabeth Big Chief Elizabeth relates the early attempts by Elizabethan adventurers to colonise the North American continent; the book takes its title from the Algonquian Indian word 'weroanza', used by the indigenous population in reference to Queen Elizabeth I. It focuses on the pioneering expedition of 1585 to colonise Roanoke Island in what is now North Carolina – an expedition that was financed and backed by the Elizabethan courtier and adventurer, Sir Walter Raleigh.

The historical reconstruction of the attempted settlement makes extensive use of eyewitness accounts written by those who occupied senior positions in Raleigh's expedition – notably Sir Richard Grenville, Ralph Lane, John White (colonist and artist) and Thomas Harriot, and details the hardships faced by the colonists as they struggled to survive an increasingly hostile environment. It also seeks to explain the enduring mystery of the lost colonists – 115 men, women and children left behind on Roanoke Island when John White returned to England for help.

Milton's 2013 children's book, Children of the Wild, is a fictional recreation of the Roanoke colony. It uses some of the same original sources, notably Thomas Harriot and John White, for background material.

 Nathaniel's Nutmeg Nathaniel's Nutmeg follows the battles between English and Dutch merchant adventurers as they competed for control of the world supply of nutmeg, which commanded fabulous prices in the 17th century, because it was widely (and wrongly) thought to cure diseases such as the plague. (Nutmeg may in fact have some medicinal properties, but it does not possess the powers attributed to it in the seventeenth century.)

By 1616, the Dutch had seized all of the principal islands, leaving Run as the only one not in their control. On Christmas Day, 1616, the English adventurer (and East India Company employee) Nathaniel Courthope arrived with two ships and persuaded the native islanders to grant him an exclusive monopoly over their annual nutmeg harvest. The agreement that was signed with the local chieftains did far more than that: the document effectively ceded the islands of Run and Ai to England in perpetuity.  "And whereas King James by the grace of God is King of England, Scotland, France and Ireland, is also by the mercy of God King of Pooloway (Ai Island) and Poolarun (Run Island)."

For the next five years, Courthope and his band of starving followers were besieged by a Dutch force one hundred times greater. The Dutch eventually captured Run, destroyed the plantations, and killed Courthope. According to Milton, the English, smarting over their loss of Run, "responded" 48 years later (in 1664) by attacking and annexing New Netherland, which they renamed New York.

At the Treaty of Breda in 1667, ending the Second Anglo-Dutch War, the Dutch did not press their claims on New Netherland and largely agreed to maintain the colonial status quo. In Milton's narrative, this was in return for the English relinquishing their territorial claim to the island of Run.

 The Riddle and the Knight 

Milton's debut non-fiction title, The Riddle and the Knight, is a work of historical detection. It follows the trail of Sir John Mandeville, a medieval knight who claimed to have undertaken a thirty-four-year voyage through scores of little known lands, including Persia, Arabia, Ethiopia, India, Sumatra and China. Mandeville subsequently wrote a book about his odyssey: it is widely known as The Travels.The Riddle and the Knight investigates Sir John Mandeville's purported voyage and the shadowy personal biography of the knight himself. It contends that the widely held assertion – that Mandeville's real identity was John de Bourgogne – is based on a flawed testimony of the chronicler John d'Outremeuse.

The book asserts that Mandeville's autobiographical portrait – in which he claims to be a knight living in St Albans – is probably correct. It also contends that Mandeville was forced to flee his native England when his overlord, Humphrey de Bohun, led a troubled rebellion against King Edward II.The Riddle and the Knight concludes that the greater part of Mandeville's voyage is fabricated or compiled from earlier sources, notably Odoric of Pordenone, Giovanni da Pian del Carpine and Vincent de Beauvais. In spite of Mandeville's extensive borrowings from other works, Milton offers a reappraisal of Mandeville's place in the history of exploration. Mandeville's Travels captured the imagination of the medieval world and was a source of inspiration to Christopher Columbus as well as notable figures from the Elizabethan era, including Sir Walter Ralegh and Sir Martin Frobisher.

Milton assesses Mandeville's influence on English literature. William Shakespeare, John Milton, and John Keats turned to the Travels'' for inspiration and until the Victorian era it was Sir John Mandeville, not Geoffrey Chaucer who was known as the 'father of English prose'. Milton's book seeks to restore Mandeville to his literary pedestal, as well as advancing the thesis that he should also be considered the father of exploration.

References

External links 

 The official website of Giles Milton

People from Buckinghamshire
Alumni of the University of Bristol
Living people
British children's writers
21st-century British novelists
British historians
British male novelists
21st-century British male writers
1966 births